In number theory, a prime triplet is a set of three prime numbers in which the smallest and largest of the three differ by 6.

Examples

The first prime triplets  are

(5, 7, 11), (7, 11, 13), (11, 13, 17), (13, 17, 19), (17, 19, 23), (37, 41, 43), (41, 43, 47), (67, 71, 73), (97, 101, 103), (101, 103, 107), (103, 107, 109), (107, 109, 113), (191, 193, 197), (193, 197, 199), (223, 227, 229), (227, 229, 233), (277, 281, 283), (307, 311, 313), (311, 313, 317), (347, 349, 353), (457, 461, 463), (461, 463, 467), (613, 617, 619), (641, 643, 647), (821, 823, 827), (823, 827, 829), (853, 857, 859), (857, 859, 863), (877, 881, 883), (881, 883, 887)

Subpairs of primes
A prime triplet contains a single pair of:
Sexy primes: .

Higher-order versions
When this happens, the five involved primes form a prime quintuplet.

Conjecture on prime triplets
Similarly to the twin prime conjecture, it is conjectured that there are infinitely many prime triplets. The first known gigantic prime triplet was found in 2008 by Norman Luhn and François Morain.

The Skewes number for the triplet  is 87613571, and for the triplet  it is 337867.

References

External links
 
 
 

Classes of prime numbers
Unsolved problems in number theory